Yassıca Island (literally, "flat island") is an island in the Gulf of İzmir, Turkey. Sometimes the island is also called Alman Adası ("German's Island").

The island is uninhabited. But the İzmir municipality has established a quay, a 400-meter beach and a restaurant in the southern portion of the island. Moreover İzdeniz (transportation company of İzmir municipality) operates regular ferry services from Konak and Karşıyaka terminals to the island. The voyage time to Yassıca Island is about 1.5 hours.

References

Islands of Turkey
Islands of İzmir Province
Urla District
Aegean islands
Gulf of İzmir